Cetonana is a genus of araneomorph spiders in the family Trachelidae, first described by Embrik Strand in 1929.

Species
 it contains five species:
Cetonana laticeps (Canestrini, 1868) — Europe, Russia (Caucasus)
Cetonana lineolata (Mello-Leitão, 1941) — Brazil
Cetonana petrunkevitchi Mello-Leitão, 1945 — Brazil
Cetonana setosa (Simon, 1897) — Brazil
Cetonana shaanxiensis Jin, Yin & Zhang, 2017 — China

References

External links

Araneomorphae genera
Trachelidae